Billy Stokes was an Australian professional rugby league footballer of the 1940s. He played 5 seasons in the New South Wales Rugby League Premiership - all for South Sydney. He was also the father of former 1960s rugby league player Bill Stokes (who also played for South Sydney).

Playing career 
Stokes made his professional rugby league debut in round 12 of 1940 versus Newtown. He kicked a goal, but his side lost 8-37. The following round, he kicked two goals in Souths' 24-22 win over Canterbury-Bankstown. In Round 14, Stokes scored the first try of his career in a win against North Sydney. He also kicked three goals that game, totaling nine points. He finished the season with 1 try and 6 goals (15 points) in 3 appearances.

Stokes did not play much of 1941, only making two appearances. He did not score that season, playing in double-digit losses to Balmain Tigers (Round 13) and the Western Suburbs Magpies (Round 14).

He played nine games in 1942, scoring a try in the second round against Western Suburbs. Stokes also made an appearance in the City Cup, though Souths lost to the St. George Dragons 24-10. Newtown won the City Cup that year.

Stokes did not play the following season. He opened the 1944 season however, with a 5-goal performance in a win against St. George. This time, he played fullback for the whole season - a position he played throughout 1942. He kicked 5 more goals by the season's end, finishing with 10 goals in 5 appearances.

1945 turned out to be Stokes' final season. He played fullback for the first half of the season, before transitioning to five-eighth in his final games. Round 14 - the last round of the season was Stokes' final game. His team was against Balmain, losing 12-29.

He finished his career with a respectable 2 tries and 21 goals in 26 appearances.

References 

South Sydney Rabbitohs players
Rugby league fullbacks
Rugby league centres
Rugby league five-eighths
Australian rugby league players
Rugby league players from Sydney